Salado is a town in Bell County, Texas, United States.  Salado was first incorporated in 1867 for the sole purpose of building a bridge across Salado Creek. In 2000, the citizens of Salado voted in favor of reincorporation, before which it was a census-designated place. The population was 2,394 at the 2020 census.

History
Archaeological evidence of a paleolithic Native American settlement dating back about 15,500 years, the Buttermilk Creek Complex, has been unearthed in Salado.

The first record of white settlers in the area occurred in 1834, but by 1836, the pioneer settlers abandoned the area due to frequent Indian attacks and the invasion by General Santa Anna and the Mexican Army. The first permanent Anglo-American settler at Salado was Archibald Willingham in 1850. In 1852, the Salado Post Office was established. In 1859, the Salado College Joint Stock Company was created by Col. Elijah Sterling Clack Robertson, who donated 320 acres north and south of the springs to be broken into lots and form the village of Salado, with the proceeds of the sale going to form Salado College. The college operated from 1860 to 1885 and 1895 to 1913; the former college building was occupied by the Thomas Arnold High School.

From 1866 to 1885, the famous Chisholm Trail cattle drives passed through this area, with the Stagecoach Inn being one of the stops. In 1867, Salado incorporated to build a bridge across Salado Creek. By 1884, Salado had a population of 900, seven churches, 14 stores, two hotels, two blacksmiths, and three cotton gins. However, after the railroads bypassed Salado to the north and south, trade moved away from the town and the population began to dwindle, hitting 400 by 1914 and down to 200 by 1950.

The town is home to the Stagecoach Inn, the oldest continuously running hotel in Texas.

Nineteen Salado locations are listed in the National Register of Historic Places, including the George Washington Baines House.

Geography
Interstate 35 runs through the village, leading north  to Belton, the county seat, and south  to Georgetown.

Salado is located along the Balcones Fault, which causes the emergence of surface waters. The fault line is also a demarcation line for some species' natural ranges. For example, the California fan palm, Washingtonia filifera, occurs strictly west of Salado or the Balcones Fault.

Salado Creek was selected as the first Texas Natural Landmark.

Climate
The climate in this area is characterized by hot, humid summers and generally mild to cool winters.  According to the Köppen climate classification system, Salado has a humid subtropical climate, Cfa on climate maps.

Demographics

It is part of the Killeen–Temple–Fort Hood Metropolitan Statistical Area.

As of the 2020 United States census, there were 2,394 people, 990 households, and 761 families residing in the village.

As of the census of 2000,  3,475 people, 1,382 households, and 1,112 families resided in the village. The population density was 204.2 people per square mile (78.8/km2). The 1,465 housing units averaged 86.1 per square mile (33.2/km2). The racial makeup of the CDP was 92.37% White, 0.26% African American, 0.63% Native American, 0.60% Asian, 0.06% Pacific Islander, 5.15% from other races, and 0.92% from two or more races. Hispanics or Latinos of any race were 8.66% of the population.

There were 1,382 households, out of which 29.7% had children under the age of 18 living with them, 72.1% were married couples living together, 6.3% had a female householder with no husband present, and 19.5% were non-families. 16.9% of all households were made up of individuals, and 8.7% had someone living alone who was 65 years of age or older. The average household size was 2.51 and the average family size was 2.81.

In the village, the population was distributed as 22.4% under the age of 18, 5.5% from 18 to 24, 23.0% from 25 to 44, 31.3% from 45 to 64, and 17.9% who were 65 years of age or older. The median age was 44 years. For every 100 females, there were 97.0 males. For every 100 females age 18 and over, there were 94.0 males.

The median income for a household was $63,646, and for a family was $70,667. Males had a median income of $48,098 versus $26,528 for females. The per capita income was $29,685. About 3.0% of families and 3.8% of the population were below the poverty line, including 2.5% of those under age 18 and 4.5% of those age 65 or over.

Education
Salado is served by the Salado Independent School District.

The Texas Association of Private and Parochial Schools was headquartered in the Salado Civic Center in downtown Salado.

Notable people
 George Washington Baines was the maternal great-grandfather of U.S. President Lyndon B. Johnson, and was also a Baptist clergyman who served briefly as natural science professor and president of Baylor University. The home on Royal Street currently serves as a bed and breakfast, The Baines House
 Liz Carpenter, journalist
 Scott Cawthon, former video game developer, creator of the Five Nights at Freddy's series
 Miriam Amanda Ferguson, 29th and 32nd governor of Texas
 James Edward Ferguson, 26th governor of Texas
 Lela and Raymond Howard, an older married couple who disappeared (and were later found dead) and became the basis for a 1998 hit song "The Way" by Fastball
 William Whitaker Reed, one of the first settlers of Bell County and its first sheriff, was elected in 1850.

Gallery

See also

 Texas Brazos Trail

References

Further reading
 Felda Davis Shanklin. 1960. Salado, Texas Bell, Belton, Texas

External links

 Salado Chamber of Commerce
 Salado Village Voice, local newspaper
 

Villages in Bell County, Texas
Former census-designated places in Texas
Villages in Texas
Killeen–Temple–Fort Hood metropolitan area
Populated places established in 2003
2003 establishments in Texas